The Austral Society was founded in 1903 because of the influence of The Toowoomba poet George Essex Evans to promote Australian Arts and Culture.

The Society purchased part of the closed Toowoomba Gaol grounds and let a tender to roof part of the goal yard in September 1904. The Austral Hall was built on this site.

The plaque located at 84 to 88 Margaret Street (Park Motor Inn) reads:

"On this site stood the Austral Hall which was reported capable of accommodating 500 stage performers and an audience of 5,000.

"Toowoomba’s Austral Society was founded by George Essex Evans in 1903 for the promotion and advancement of music, literature, art and science.  The Society bought the site of the former gaol (1864–1904) and Architect William Hodgen designed the building using three remaining outer walls.  The roof was supported by cast iron columns made by the Toowoomba Foundry.

"The Hall was officially opened on 5 November 1904 by Sir Hugh Nelson, Lieutenant Governor of Queensland."

After his death in 1909, and subsequent important distracting historical world events including the Death of King Edward VII in 1910, and moving pictures, the Austral Society ceased in 1911.

Moving pictures were shown here by a local enterprise, Austral Pictures, until the Empire Theatre was built in 1911, and the building was later demolished.

The bulk of the roofing iron was sold and used to fence the (old) Toowoomba Showgrounds.

A town rock was directed on the open space and over the remaining western part of the wall basalt foundations after an archaeological dig was conducted by Dr Bryce Baker of The University of Southern Queensland in 1997.

A few other Australian towns (Bundaberg, Belgrave) also erected a communal use Arts & Culture building called Austral Hall.

References

Demolished buildings and structures in Queensland
Clubs and societies in Australia
1904 in Australia
Buildings and structures in Toowoomba